Justice Brennan may refer to:

 William J. Brennan Jr. (1906–1997), former Justice of the Supreme Court of the United States
 Gerard Brennan (born 1928), former Chief Justice of Australia, current Justice of the Hong Kong Court of Final Appeal
 Thomas E. Brennan (1929–2018), former Chief Justice of the Michigan Supreme Court and founder of the Thomas M. Cooley Law School

See also
Judge Brennan (disambiguation)